Fred Royers (born March 15, 1955) is a Dutch former kickboxer who competed in the middleweight division. He was known for his powerful low kicks, which is now a staple of Dutch kickboxing.

Biography and career
Royers began practicing karate at the age of 16. He went on to become the Dutch national champion on nine occasions and also won medals at the Karate World Championships in 1979, 1980, 1982 and 1984 as well as the World Games 1981. He also competed in amateur boxing.

In 1978, Royers joined the Mejiro Gym and took up kickboxing. He became the European Savate Champion in 1984 when he defeated Robert Paturel via technical knockout in Paris, France. The following year, he won the WKA Middleweight Championship of the World when he won a 12-round decision victory over Yasuo Tabata. He was forced to retire in 1986, however, after breaking his arm twice in training.

Following his retirement, Royers opened his own gym in his home town of Arnhem and began working as the Dutch language kickboxing commentator for Eurosport in 1990.

Titles

 Amateur boxing
 Oost district champion
 Karate
 5x Middleweight Champion of the Netherlands
 4x Openweight Champion of the Netherlands
 1979 European Championship Champion
 1980 World Championships: Bronze Medal
 1981 World Games: Silver Medal
 1982 World Championships: Bronze Medal
 1984 European Championships: Bronze Medal
 Kickboxing
 Middleweight Muay Thai Champion of the Netherlands
 Middleweight Kickboxing Champion of the Netherlands
 European Savate Champion
 WKA European Middleweight Champion
 WKA Middleweight Champion of the World
 WKL Hall of Fame WKL

Kickboxing record

|-
| 
| Loss
| style="text-align:left" |  Youssef Zenaf
| 
| Paris, France
| Decision
| align="center" | 9
| align="center" | 3:00
| For IKL and WAKO Super Middleweight World titles.
|-
| 
| Win
| style="text-align:left" |  Yasuo Tabata
| 
| Amsterdam, Netherlands
| Decision
| align="center" | 12
| align="center" | 3:00
| Wins WKA Middleweight World title.
|-
| 
| Win
| style="text-align:left" |  Ralf Berger
| 
| West Berlin, West Germany
| TKO (low kick)
| align="center" | 6
| align="center" | 
| Defends WKA Middleweight European title.
|-
| 
| Win
| style="text-align:left" |  Keith Nathan
| 
| Amsterdam, Netherlands
| TKO (low kick)
| align="center" | 4
| align="center" | 
| Defends WKA Middleweight European title.
|-
| 
| Win
| style="text-align:left" |  Pascal LePlat
| 
| Paris, France
| Decision
| align="center" | 9
| align="center" | 3:00
| Wins WKA Middleweight European title.
|-
| 
| Win
| style="text-align:left" |  Robert Paturel
| 
| Paris, France
| Decision
| align="center" | 5
| align="center" | 3:00
| 
|-
| 
| Win
| style="text-align:left" |  Ernie Jackson
| 
| Amsterdam, Netherlands
| Decision (split)
| align="center" | 9
| align="center" | 3:00
| 
|-
| 
| Win
| style="text-align:left" |  Christian Bafir
| 
| Paris, France
| Decision
| align="center" | 5
| align="center" | 3:00
| 
|-
| 
| Win
| style="text-align:left" |  Larry Nichols
| 
| Hollywood, Florida, USA
| Decision
| align="center" | 9
| align="center" | 3:00
| 
|-
| 
| Win
| style="text-align:left" |  Billy Chau
| 
| Amsterdam, Netherlands
| Decision
| align="center" | 9
| align="center" | 3:00
| 
|-
| 
| Win
| style="text-align:left" |  Gaetan Litricin
| 
| Amsterdam, Netherlands
| TKO (forfeit)
| align="center" | 1
| align="center" | 0:00
| 
|-
| 
| Win
| style="text-align:left" |  Youssef Zenaf
| Nuit de la Boxe Americaine
| Paris, France
| Decision
| align="center" | 7
| align="center" | 3:00
| Wins BFS Middleweight European title.
|-
| 
| Win
| style="text-align:left" |  L. Minocci
| 
| Amsterdam, Netherlands
| TKO (forfeit)
| align="center" | 1
| align="center" | 0:00
| 
|-
| 
| Win
| style="text-align:left" |  Robert Davis
| 
| Amsterdam, Netherlands
| KO
| align="center" | 1
| align="center" | 
| Wins NKBB Super Middleweight Dutch title.
|-
| 
| Win
| style="text-align:left" |  Robert Paturel
| 
| Paris, France
| TKO (kick)
| align="center" | 4
| align="center" | 
| Wins BFS Super Middleweight European title.
|-
| 
| Win
| style="text-align:left" |  Christian Bafir
| 
| Amsterdam, Netherlands
| Decision
| align="center" | 5
| align="center" | 3:00
| 
|-
| 
| Win
| style="text-align:left" |  Hans de Ruiter
| 
| Paris, France
| TKO
| align="center" | 2
| align="center" | 
| 
|-
| 
| Win
| style="text-align:left" |  Henk Kooy
| 
| Amsterdam, Netherlands
| Decision
| align="center" | 5
| align="center" | 5:00
| 
|-
| 
| Win
| style="text-align:left" |  Niek Bloemberg
| 
| Amsterdam, Netherlands
| KO
| align="center" | 2
| align="center" | 
| 
|-
| 
| Win
| style="text-align:left" |  Sarge Solignac
| 
| Paris, France
| Decision
| align="center" | 5
| align="center" | 3:00
| 
|-
| 
| Win
| style="text-align:left" |  Pascal Leplat
| 
| Paris, France
| Decision
| align="center" | 5
| align="center" | 3:00
| 
|-
| 
| Win
| style="text-align:left" |  Alan Dixon
| 
| Amsterdam, Netherlands
| Decision
| align="center" | 3
| align="center" | 3:00
| 
|-
| 
| Win
| style="text-align:left" |  Tuncay Coban
| 
| Amsterdam, Netherlands
| Decision
| align="center" | 3
| align="center" | 3:00
| 
|-
| colspan=9 | Legend:

References

External links
 

1955 births
Living people
Dutch male kickboxers
Middleweight kickboxers
Dutch male karateka
Dutch savateurs
Kickboxing commentators
Sportspeople from Arnhem
World Games silver medalists
Competitors at the 1981 World Games
World Games medalists in karate
20th-century Dutch people
21st-century Dutch people